Marcus Oldham College is an agricultural, equine and farm management tertiary education institution located in Geelong, Victoria and is the only private agricultural college operating in Australia. Founded in 1962, the institution attracts enrolments from domestic and international students.

At the undergraduate level, the school offers the following degrees: Bachelor of Business in Farm Management, Bachelor of Business in Agribusiness, Associate Degree of Agribusiness, Associate Degree of Farm Business Management, Diploma of Agribusiness, and Diploma of Equine Management. The postgraduate program consists of a Masters, Graduate Certificate and a Graduate Diploma in Agribusiness.

In May 2008, the college opened the Centre for the Study of Rural Australia on its campus. The Centre focuses on the intersection of agriculture and rural communities and aims to foster sustainable practices through community involvement.

References

External links
Marcus Oldham College official site

Australian vocational education and training providers
Education in Geelong
Educational institutions established in 1962
Agricultural universities and colleges in Australia